Christopher Chung may refer to:
 Christopher Chung (politician)
 Christopher Chung (actor)
 Christopher Chung (footballer)